Nonkon is a small town and commune in the Cercle of Kolokani in the Koulikoro Region of south-western Mali. As of 1998 the commune (made of 20 villages) had a population of 15,253. 
The economy is based on agriculture.

References

Communes of Koulikoro Region